South Carolina increased its apportionment from 6 seats to 8 after the 1800 census.

See also 
 South Carolina's 4th congressional district special election, 1802
 United States House of Representatives elections, 1802 and 1803
 List of United States representatives from South Carolina

1803
South Carolina
United States House of Representatives